Leung Bik (born Leung Bik-wo with the courtesy name Tai-wah; 1843 – 1923), also known as Mr. Bik, was a Wing Chun martial artist. He was one of Ip Man's teachers.

History
He was born in Foshan in 1843 as the second of the nine sons of Leung Jan by his second wife with the surname of Cheng.

At the young age he practiced Wing Chun under his father and grand-teacher Wong Wah-bo. By then, Leung Bik's Wing Chun skill sets were in its most completed forms, which three forms includes Mu ren zhuang, Eight-cut knives and Six-and-a-Half Point Pole, as well as Qigong.

Due to the political situation in the late Qing Dynasty, Leung left Foshan for Hong Kong, where he made a living running a silk and satin business at Cha Wai Street (present day Jervois Street) in Sheung Wan.

In 1909, Leung was introduced to Ip Man by Ip's classmate Lai, who was also a son of Leung's friend. Leung challenged Ip to a friendly sparring match at Lai's house, Leung defeated Ip twice and Ip left without a word. Impressed by the young man's skill, Leung requested Lai for the disheartened Ip's return and trained him until his own death in 1911.

Known descendants
Leung had two sons:
 1st son: Leung Shiu-hung, courtesy name Sam-pei – Born in 1880, also skilled in martial arts, he was a businessman, due to an economic downturn, he died of depression in 1929.
Grandson: Leung Man-lok: son of Leung Shiu-hung, a 7th generation Wing Chun practitioner, currently resided in Hong Kong.
Great-granddaughter: Leung Lai-ngor – currently resided in Canada.
Great-granddaughter: Leung Choi – currently resided at Nanhai District.
 2nd son: Leung Shiu-kau, courtesy name Ting-pei – Born in 1886, no known information, presumed deceased.

In popular culture
In the 2006 television series Wing Chun, he was portrayed by Nicholas Tse.

In the 2010 film The Legend Is Born: Ip Man, he was portrayed by Ip Chun, the eldest son of Ip Man.

In the 2013 television series Ip Man, he was portrayed by Bruce Leung.

References

1845 births
1911 deaths
Wing Chun practitioners from Hong Kong
People from Foshan
Cantonese people
Sportspeople from Guangdong